Langley Frank Willard Smith  (15 August 1897 – 12 June 1917) was a Canadian Flying Ace in World War I credited with 8 victories.

Background
Smith was born in Philipsburg, in the Province of Quebec, and was brought up by his grandmother, his father having been widowed. Whilst attending Flying School in St. Augustine, Florida, Smith accidentally stepped into a revolving propeller and received near-fatal head injuries. However he completed his training at the Curtiss Flying School in Newport News, Virginia, qualifying as a pilot on 29 June 1916.

Involvement in World War 1

Posted to 4 Naval Squadron on 25 April 1917, he scored eight victories flying the Sopwith Pup. In June 1917, his squadron was the first to receive the new Sopwith Camel. A few days later, while attempting to intercept a flight of 16 Gotha bombers, Smith was killed when his Camel lost a wing and broke up in mid-air.

He is buried in the Houtave Churchyard, Zuienkerke, West-Vlaanderen, Belgium.

Decorations
 Distinguished Service Cross
Belgian Croix de guerre
Chevalier de l'Ordre de la Couronne (Knight of the Order of the Crown)

References

1897 births
1917 deaths
People from Saint-Armand, Quebec
Canadian World War I flying aces

Knights of the Order of the Crown (Belgium)
Canadian military personnel killed in World War I
Canadian military personnel from Quebec
Recipients of the Croix de Guerre 1914–1918 (France)
Canadian recipients of the Distinguished Service Cross (United Kingdom)